Twin Peaks are a pair of mountain peaks in the Adobe Range of Elko County, in Nevada, United States. The East Twin is slightly higher than the West Twin. Both summits contains several radio towers.

Summit panorama

References

Mountains of Elko County, Nevada
Mountains of Nevada